Anisotoma is a genus of round fungus beetles in the family Leiodidae. There are at least 20 described species in Anisotoma.

Species
These 22 species belong to the genus Anisotoma:

 Anisotoma amica Brown, 1937 i g b
 Anisotoma axillaris Gyllenhal, 1810 g
 Anisotoma basalis (LeConte, 1853) i g
 Anisotoma bifoveata Wheeler, 1979 i g
 Anisotoma blanchardi (Horn, 1880) i g b
 Anisotoma castanea (Herbst, 1792) g
 Anisotoma confusa (Horn, 1880) i g
 Anisotoma discolor (Melsheimer, 1844) i g b
 Anisotoma errans Brown, 1937 i g b
 Anisotoma expolita Brown, 1937 i g
 Anisotoma geminata (Horn, 1880) i g b
 Anisotoma glabra (Kugelann, 1794) g
 Anisotoma globososa Hatch, 1929 i g b
 Anisotoma horni (Horn, 1880) b
 Anisotoma humeralis (Fabricius, 1792) i g b
 Anisotoma inops Brown, 1937 i g b
 Anisotoma nevadensis Brown, 1937 i g
 Anisotoma obsoleta (Horn, 1880) i g
 Anisotoma orbicularis (Herbst, 1792) i g
 Anisotoma reticulonota Wheeler, 1979 i g
 Anisotoma smetanai Angelini & Marzo, 1995 g
 Anisotoma tenulucida Wheeler, 1979 i g

Data sources: i = ITIS, c = Catalogue of Life, g = GBIF, b = Bugguide.net

References

Further reading

External links

 

Leiodidae